Rupert Bear: Follow the Magic... is a British animated children's television series based on the Mary Tourtel character, Rupert Bear. Aimed at pre-school children, the show is part stop motion, part computer-generated imagery. Rupert Bear still wears his trademark bright yellow plaid trousers and matching scarf, with a red jumper. Rupert has brown fur once again, just as he was originally drawn in 1920: when he appeared as a cartoon character in the Daily Express, they economised on ink by printing him white.

It was broadcast on Five from 8 November to 20 November 2006, as part of their Milkshake! block. Thirteen 10-minute original episodes were broadcast and subsequently repeated. Following the success of these, a further 39 episodes have been produced to date.

The series is available for streaming on Peacock.

Characters
Rupert Bear – The adventure loving bear that makes everyday into an exciting adventure to enjoy and often brings his friends along.
Bill Badger – the fact-loving badger
Edward Trunk – timid elephant
Ping Pong – magical, female Pekingese
Ming – Ping Pong's pet baby dragon
Raggety – young tree elf
Freddy and Freda – mischievous fox twins
Miranda – beautiful, whimsical mermaid
Bruce – Rupert Bear's car

Plot
Each episode follows an adventure in the woodland world of Nutwood, England. The characters go between Rupert's cottage, the friends' tree house, Ping Pong's colourful pagoda and the ocean, where Miranda lives.

Episodes

Series 1

Series 2

Series 3

Series 4

References

External links
 
 Rupert Bear: Follow the Magic… on Five Milkshake!

2006 British television series debuts
2008 British television series endings
2000s British animated television series
2000s British children's television series
2000s preschool education television series
Animated preschool education television series
Animated television series about bears
Animated television series about dragons
Animated television series about elephants
Animated television series about foxes
British preschool education television series
British stop-motion animated television series
Channel 5 (British TV channel) original programming
Rupert Bear
Television shows based on comic strips
Television series by Universal Television
Television series by Cosgrove Hall Films
English-language television shows